I Believe in You is a 1952 British drama film directed by Michael Relph and Basil Dearden. It stars Celia Johnson and Cecil Parker and is based on the book Court Circular by Sewell Stokes. Inspired by the recently successful The Blue Lamp, Relph and Dearden used a semi-documentary approach in telling the story of the lives of probation officers and their charges.

Plot
Henry Phipps, a retired Colonial Serviceman, takes on the job of a probation officer, and finds it a challenge. Various characters' lives are examined as Phipps and his colleagues attempt to reform (amongst others), a hardened criminal and a juvenile delinquent.

Cast

Celia Johnson as Matty Matheson
Cecil Parker as Henry Phipps
Godfrey Tearle as Judge Pyke
Harry Fowler as Charlie Hooker
George Relph as Mr. Dove
Joan Collins as Norma Hart  
Laurence Harvey as Jordie Bennett  
Ernest Jay as Judge Quayle  
Ursula Howells as Hon Ursula  
Sid James as Sergeant Body  
Katie Johnson as Miss Mackline  
Ada Reeve as Mrs Crockett  
Brenda De Banzie as Mrs Hooker  
Alex McCrindle as Tom Haines  
Laurence Naismith as Sergeant Braxton
Gladys Henson as Mrs Stevens
 Richard Hart as Eric Stevens
 Stanley Escane as Buck Wilson
Fred Griffiths as Fred Crump
 David Hannaford as Braxton Child
Judith Furse as Policewoman Jones
Mandy Miller as Child 
Glyn Houston as Man giving directions

Critical reception
The New York Times wrote, "it shines with understanding and, except for a brash climactic moment, it is a warm and adult adventure, which pins deserving medals on unsung heroes without heroics."
Allmovie wrote, "the semi-documentary approach established early in I Believe in You gives way to sentiment as the film winds down." 
TV Guide noted, "an engaging drama with surprisingly good performances from (Joan) Collins, (Harry) Fowler, and (Laurence) Harvey."

References

External links

1952 films
1952 drama films
British prison drama films
Ealing Studios films
Films directed by Basil Dearden
Films set in London
Films with screenplays by Basil Dearden
Films with screenplays by Michael Relph
Films with screenplays by Jack Whittingham
British black-and-white films
1950s prison films
1950s English-language films
1950s British films